CHOR-FM is a Canadian radio station that broadcasts an adult hits format at 98.5 FM in Summerland, British Columbia. The station is owned by Bell Media and is branded as Bounce 98.5.

CHOR began as CKSP at 1450 AM in 1972, as a part-time satellite re-broadcaster of CKOK in Penticton. Okanagan Radio Limited put the station on the air to improve coverage to the north. The first manager of the station was Russ Mitten, who was succeeded by Jim Hart, who became Member of Parliament. The station originally broadcast local programming from 6 a.m. to 9 a.m. and eventually from 6 a.m. to 5 p.m.

The CKSP call sign was changed by new owners in 1991.

Switch to FM

On June 17, 2010, CHOR received approval by the CRTC to convert CHOR AM 1450 to the FM band at 98.5 MHz to broadcast an adult contemporary format targeting adults aged 18 to 54.

The move from 1450 AM to the new 98.5 FM frequency took place November 24, 2010. The station was then rebranded as 98.5 EZ Rock. 1450 was shut down in December.

As part of a mass format reorganization by Bell Media, on May 18, 2021, CHOR flipped to adult hits under the Bounce branding.

Former logo

References

External links
 Bounce 98.5
 
 

HOR
HOR
HOR
Radio stations established in 1972
Radio stations in the Okanagan
1972 establishments in British Columbia